PC² is the Programming Contest Control System developed at California State University, Sacramento in support of Computer Programming Contest activities of the ACM, and in particular the ACM International Collegiate Programming Contest. It was used to conduct the ACM ICPC World Finals in 1990 and from 1994 through 2009. In 2010, the ACM ICPC World Finals switched to using Kattis, the KTH automated teaching tool; however, PC2 continues to be used for a large number of ICPC Regional Contests around the world.

Computer programming contests and PC²
Computer programming contest have rules and methods for judging submissions. The following describes in a general way a contest where PC2 is used.

A computer programming contest is a competition where teams submit (computer program) solutions to judges. The teams
are given a set of problems to solve in a limited amount of time (for example 8-13 problems in 5 hours).
The judges then give pass/fail judgements to the submitted solutions. Team rankings are computed based on the solutions, when the solutions were submitted and how many attempts were made to solve the problem. The judges test in a Black box testing where the teams do not have access to the judges' test data.

PC2 manages single or multi-site programming contests. It provides a team a way to log in, test solutions, submit solutions and view judgements from judges. PC2 provides judges a way to request team solutions (from a PC2 server) run/execute the solution and enter a judgment. The PC2 scoreboard module computes and creates standings and statistics web pages (HTML/XML).  PC2 is easy to install on Linux/Linux-like systems and MS Windows and does not require super-user (root) access to install it or use it: this makes it an attractive choice for users who may not have super-user access.

Usage and User Experiences 

PC2 was used for the ACM International Collegiate Programming Contest World Finals from 1994 to 2009. It has also been used in hundreds of ICPC Regional Contests around the world.  It has been used continuously by the ACM Pacific Northwest Regional Contest since 1989, as well as by many other ICPC Regional Contests including the Africa and Arabia Regional Contests, numerous Regional Contests in Asia, and several Regional Contests in the U.S. It remains today the single most widely used Contest Control System for ICPC Regional Contests.

PC2 has been used by the Africa and Arabia Collegiate Programming Contest (ACPC) every year since its inception more than 25  years ago. ACPC comprises a set of Regional Contests, including the separate Saudi, Nigerian, Oman, South Africa, Togolese, Moroccan, Kuwait, Algerian, Jordanian, Palestinian, Qatar, Beninese, Egyptian, Lebanese, Ethiopian, Tunisian, Bahrain, Sudanese, Syrian, and Angolan Collegiate Programming Contests.  Every one of these Regional/National Contests uses PC2; many of the Regional Contests are fed by sub-regional contests, all of which also use PC2.  The winners at each Regional Contest advance to the ACPC Championship, which also uses PC2.  ACPC also sponsors a variety of additional contests, including "ACPC Kickoff", "ACPC for Girls", "ACPC for Teens", and "ACPC for Seniors"; again, all of these contests also use PC2.

The ICPC (formerly ACM) Greater New York Regional Programming Contest in North America has been using PC2  for over 20 years.  Greater New York has used PC2 many different ways over the years including single site, multi-site and the Web-based team client.   The judges in the Greater New York region prefer PC2 over other Contest Control Systems since it gives them the greatest flexibility in judging contestant submissions.  Submissions may be judged manually or using computer auto-judging.  Often, the judges prefer to judge some problems manually, and PC2 provides this capability.  In addition, the PC2 development team has quickly responded to questions and help with any issues that came up.

PC2 has been in use by the ACM Mid-Atlantic Programming Contest for several years. In earlier years, systems administrators had limited success with the program due to its distributed nature. Each of the contest sites ran a PC2 server which needed to initiate and accept Java RMI. Using a central datacenter in the fall of 2005 revealed no problems.
In 2014, PC2 crashed 3:45h into the contest, preventing teams from obtaining receipts for their submissions. Judges were unable to retrieve submissions - the contest ended without announcing a winner. It took one week to try to recover those submissions.
A similar failure occurred in 2016.  System administrators had decided to deploy a web add-on to PC2 which then failed under load. The contest start time was delayed by 90 minutes. Teams were unable to submit problems and the contest director scrambled to find a work-around that let teams save problems with a time stamp to be considered later.  In 2013, system operators failed to enter the correct team names, leaving teams without information about the standings in the contest (the scoreboard). System operators were unable to correct the team names during the contest.  Because of these incidents, organizers of the region are now considering moving to an alternative system, such as Kattis, which is the official system used by ACM for the ICPC World Finals.

With the introduction of version 9 (socket-based version) delays, most firewall issues with version 8 have been addressed.

A brief revision history

See also 

 ACM International Collegiate Programming Contest
 Online Judge

References

External links 
 
 PC2 Wiki
 Competitive Learning Initiative Contest System (CLICS)

Other uses
 PC² is the abbreviation of the Paderborn Center for Parallel Computing, an institute of the Paderborn University, Germany (http://www.upb.de/pc2)

Programming contests